Bill H. McAfee (March 10, 1931 – September 12, 2015) was an American politician in the state of Tennessee. McAfee served in the Tennessee House of Representatives as a Republican for the 27th District from 1976 to 2001. A native of Gordon County, Georgia, he was a broadcaster and hospital administrator/employee. He is an alumnus of University of Tennessee at Chattanooga. He died in 2015.

References

1931 births
2015 deaths
People from Gordon County, Georgia
Politicians from Chattanooga, Tennessee
University of Tennessee at Chattanooga alumni
Republican Party members of the Tennessee House of Representatives